Gadchiroli ( [ɡəɖt͡ʃiɾoliː]) is a city and a municipal council in Gadchiroli district  in the state of Maharashtra, central India. It is located on eastern side of Maharashtra, and is the administrative headquarters of the district. Gadchiroli is called a lung of Maharashtra as it has almost 35% of this district has forest cover. The main river flowing through city is the Wainganga River. The landscape is lush and green during the monsoon season which is prone to flooding. Gadchiroli is known for its forests. Teak is grown commercially and bamboos are used for various crafts.

Notable places and Personalities 
Some notable places and personalities in the town include:
 Chaprala Wildlife Sanctuary
Semana-Hanuman Temple – About  from center of town (Gandhi Chowk)
Hemalkasa – Situated in Bhamragarh Block (east side of district),  from Gadchiroli.
Allapalli – Known as Teak City of District, where all forest administration offices and the main marketline, educational and other resources.
 Markhanda – A temple dedicated to Lord Shiva on the banks of Waingan toaga. There is a big fair on  Mahashivratri
 BILT (Ashti) – A unit of Ballarpur Paper Mills in Ashti.
 Gadchiroli lake – located at the centre of the city.
 Vairagad Fort – Built by the Gond kings as their residence and fortress, near Armori town

 Bhandareshwar – An ancient temple to Lord Shiva situated to the west of Vairagad village, high on a mound at the confluence of the Khobragadi and Vainlochna rivers. This shrine is a good example of architecture and the carved walls are believed to be from the Hemadpanth period.
 Adishakti Temple – Situated at Vairagad, this temple enshrines an idol of Adishakti Devi, found during a 1986 excavation. The idol has four hands and is an example of the carvings undertaken by the sculptors of the erstwhile era.
Wadadham Fossils Park.

History 
In ancient times the region was ruled by the Rashtrakutas, the Chalukyas, the Yadavas of Deogiri and later the Gonds of Gadchiroli. In the 13th century Khandkya Ballal Shah founded Chandrapur and made it his capital. Chandrapur subsequently came under Maratha rule. In 1853 Berar, of which Chandrapur (then called Chanda) was part, was ceded to the British East India Company. In 1854 Chandrapur became an independent district of Berar.

In 1905 the British created the tehsil of Gadchiroli by transfer of a zamindari estate from Chandrapur and Bramhapuri. It was part of the Central Provinces until 1956 when, with the reorganisation of the states, Chandrapur was transferred to Bombay state. In 1960, when Maharashtra was created, Chandrapur became a district of the new state. On 26 August 1982 Chandrapur was divided, with Gadchiroli tehsil becoming an independent district.

Naxalism is highly prevalent in Gadchiroli, with the guerrilla fighters taking to the hills and dense forests, 15 soldiers have been killed in an IED blast at Kurkheda area in 2019. Gadchiroli has also been designated as part of the Red Corridor. Settlements are being explored by many social workers.

Geography 
It has an average elevation of 217 metres (715 feet).
Gadchiroli District is one of the largest in Maharashtra by land area. The town and surrounding area is considered to be beautiful during the monsoon season (July to September), and is surrounded by a teak wood forest.

Climate 
Located near centre of Indian peninsula, far from the Bay of Bengal and the Arabian Sea, Gadchiroli has a tropical wet-and-dry climate with dry conditions prevailing for most of the year. Summers are extremely hot lasting from March to June, with maximum temperatures occurring in May.

Demographics 
According to the 2001 India census, Gadchiroli had a population of 42,464.  Males constituted 51% of the population and females 49%. Gadchiroli had an average literacy rate of 74%, higher than the national average of 59.5%. Male literacy was 80%, and female literacy was 67%. 13% of the population was under 6 years of age.

The main languages spoken are Marathi, Hindi, Gondi, Madiya, Bengali and Telugu. The literacy rate is improving with an increase in educational facilities.

The people of Gadchiroli celebrate many indigenous festivals. Adivasi peoples celebrate festivals like Mohram, Pola, etc. The Bengali community here celebrate festivals like Durga Pooja, Basanti Pooja, Kali pooja, etc.

Administration

Politics
The MP of Gadchiroli-Chimur constituency is Ashok Nete. The MLA from different constituencies within are:
  Aheri – Dharmarao Baba Atram 
  Gadchiroli – Deorao Madguji Holi
  Armori – Krushnaji Damaji Gajbe

Transport
Gadchiroli is connected by roads to Chandrapur, Nagpur, Bhandara and Gondia. There are no rail connections to Gadchiroli, with the nearest line passing through Wadsa (Desaiganj).Wadsa is the only railway station in Gadchiroli District. The condition of roadways in the area is being improved to provide improved security against the recent Naxilite insurgency.

Education 
All the degree colleges in Gadchiroli are now affiliated with the recently established Gondwana University, Gadchiroli. The government of Maharashtra established Gondwana university by splitting RTM Nagpur University, purported to be a major revolution in education for the tribal youth in the district.

Namdeorao Poreddiwar College of Engineering and Technology was a technical college located at Mouza Bodli, Gadchiroli but now is closed due to some administrative reasons.
Chanakya Academy Aheri & Alapalli (Competitive Exam Coaching Center)
Chanakya Academy Police Bharti Physical Ground, Aheri

See also
Make In Maharashtra

References

Cities and towns in Gadchiroli district